The 2003 California wildfires were a series of wildfires that burned throughout the state of California during the year 2003. In total, 9,116 fires burned . In October, a major wildfire outbreak in Southern California burned more than 750,000 acres, destroyed thousands of homes, and killed two dozen people. Many of the victims were killed in their cars while trying to flee.

Fires 
Below is a list of fires that exceeded  during the 2003 fire season. The list is taken from CAL FIRE's list of large fires.

References

External links

 

 
Wildfires 2003
California, 2003
2003